The Jixi Pumped Storage Power Station is a pumped-storage hydroelectric power station currently under construction in Jixi County, Anhui Province, China. Studies were carried out in 2008 and construction began in December 2010. It is expected to last 6 years. As of April 2017 the dam is completed. First turbine was commissioned in December 2019, followed by second in May 2020 and third and fourth in August 2020. The last two units were commissioned in February 2021.

Reservoirs
The power station is located located underground near the bank of the lower reservoir and contains six 300 MW Francis pump turbine-generators.

See also

List of major power stations in Anhui
List of pumped-storage hydroelectric power stations

References

Dams in China
Pumped-storage hydroelectric power stations in China
Concrete-face rock-fill dams
Hydroelectric power stations in Anhui
Underground power stations